= Anne-Marie Hofmann =

German lawyer

Anne-Marie Hofmann (17 August 1920 in Stuttgart – 23 August 2014) was a German lawyer. She studied law at the University of Münster and in Heidelberg. In 1972, she was appointed federal prosecutor at the Federal Court. For twelve years, she remained the only federal prosecutor in the history of justice in the Federal Republic.
